Amiram Trauber (born July 16, 1939) is a former freestyle swimmer from Israel. He competed at the 1960 Summer Olympics in the 4 × 100 m medley relay and 100 m and 400 m freestyle events, but failed to reach the finals.

References

External links
 

1939 births
Living people
Israeli Jews
Israeli male freestyle swimmers
Jewish swimmers
Swimmers at the 1960 Summer Olympics
Olympic swimmers of Israel